Armand Bigot (3 May 1934 – 10 March 2011) was a French equestrian. He competed at the 1972 Summer Olympics and the 1984 Summer Olympics.

References

1934 births
2011 deaths
French male equestrians
Olympic equestrians of France
Equestrians at the 1972 Summer Olympics
Equestrians at the 1984 Summer Olympics
Sportspeople from Maine-et-Loire